Alex Matías Ibacache Mora (born 11 January 1999) is a Chilean footballer who plays as left back for Argentine side San Lorenzo on loan from Everton de Viña del Mar.

Club career
In 2023, he joined Argentine side San Lorenzo on loan from Everton on a deal for one year with an option to buy.

International career
At under-20 level, Ibacache represented Chile in both the 2018 South American Games, winning the gold medal, and the 2019 South American Championship.

Career statistics

Club
 

Notes

International

Honours
Chile U20
 South American Games Gold medal: 2018

References

1999 births
Living people
People from Quillota
Chilean footballers
Chilean expatriate footballers
Chile under-20 international footballers
Chile international footballers
Chilean Primera División players
Primera B de Chile players
Everton de Viña del Mar footballers
Cobreloa footballers
Curicó Unido footballers
Argentine Primera División players
San Lorenzo de Almagro footballers
Chilean expatriate sportspeople in Argentina
Expatriate footballers in Argentina
Association football defenders
South American Games gold medalists for Chile
South American Games medalists in football
Competitors at the 2018 South American Games